Symbiosis is any type of a close and long-term biological interaction between two different biological organisms: it can be mutualistic, commensalistic, or parasitic. The terms is also used in relation to mutually beneficial business relationships

Symbiosis may also refer to:

Arts and entertainment

Music
 Symbiosis (A Bullet for Pretty Boy album), 2012
 Symbiosis (Bill Evans album),  1974
 Symbiosis (Demdike Stare album), 2009
 Symbiosis, a 1995  album by Poverty's No Crime
 Symbiosis (musical ensemble), ambient music trio

Other arts and entertainment
 Symbiosis (film), a 1982 film directed by Paul Gerber
 Symbiosis (sculpture), a 1981 public artwork by American artist Richard Hunt
 "Symbiosis" (Star Trek: The Next Generation), TV series episode
 Symbiosis Gathering, a music and art festival

Other uses
 Symbiosis (chemical)
 Symbiosis Society, a family of educational institutions in India
 Simbiosys, a chemical software company

See also
 Cymbiosis, a music magazine
 Symbiote (comics), a fictional species